John H. Traver Farm is a historic home and farm complex located at Württemberg in Dutchess County, New York.  The main house was built about 1876 and is a two-story, five bay, center hall frame dwelling.  It is sheathed in clapboard siding and has a low pitched hipped roof with broadly projecting eaves.  It features a verandah with square support posts and ornate scroll sawn knee braces. Also on the property is a Dutch barn, a carriage house, shed, and stone walls.

It was added to the National Register of Historic Places in 1987.

References

Houses on the National Register of Historic Places in New York (state)
Houses in Dutchess County, New York
National Register of Historic Places in Dutchess County, New York